The Roman Bridge at Vaison-la-Romaine is a Roman bridge over the river Ouvèze in the southern French town of Vaison-la-Romaine. The bridge was built by the Romans in the 1st century AD, with a single arch spanning 17.20 m. It is still in use, and has survived severe flooding that swept away some more recent bridges.

See also 
 List of bridges in France
 List of Roman bridges
 Roman architecture
 Roman engineering

Sources

External links 

 
 Traianus – Technical investigation of Roman public works

Roman bridges in France
Deck arch bridges
Stone bridges in France
Bridges completed in the 1st century
Buildings and structures in Vaucluse
1st-century establishments in the Roman Empire